Kyauktaga Township (Burmese: ကျောက်တံခါးမြို့နယ်, MLCTS: kyauk.ti.hkaa.mrui.nay)is a township in Bago District in the Bago Region of Burma (Myanmar). The principal town is Kyauktaga, and Penwegon is the other major town. Both are located on the Bago–Taungoo highway and rail line.

Communities
Kyauktaga Township is subdivided into 13 wards and 47 Village Tracts which consist of 283 villages.

Notable resident
 Bo Hmu Aung (1910-2004),  a member of the Thirty Comrades

Notes

External links
 "Kyauktaga Google Satellite Map" Maplandia World Gazetteer
 "Kyaukdaga Township" at MRTV3

Townships of the Bago Region
Taungoo District